Warren W. Wilentz (March 29, 1924 – March 18, 2010) was an American lawyer and Democratic politician from New Jersey. He was the son of New Jersey Attorney General David T. Wilentz, who prosecuted Bruno Hauptmann in the Lindbergh kidnapping trial, and the brother of New Jersey Supreme Court Chief Justice Robert Wilentz.

Wilentz was born in 1924 in Perth Amboy, New Jersey to David and Lena (Goldman) Wilentz and graduated from Perth Amboy High School. He attended University of Virginia and New York University, and he received an LL.B from Rutgers University in 1949. He served as Prosecuting Attorney for Middlesex County from 1956 to 1960 and County Attorney from 1960 to 1967. He also became a partner of the Woodbridge firm founded by his father, Wilentz, Goldman & Spitzer.

In 1966, Wilentz was the Democratic nominee for the United States Senate to oppose Republican incumbent Clifford P. Case. He was recruited after several other potential candidates, including former New Jersey Governor Robert Meyner, declined to run. Wilentz was soundly defeated by a margin of 60%-37%.

Wilentz was paralyzed in an automobile collision in December 2002. He received treatment at the Kessler Institute for Rehabilitation in West Orange, New Jersey.

He died on March 18, 2010, at the age of 85.

References

External links
Biographical information for Warren W. Wilentz from The Political Graveyard

1924 births
2010 deaths
Perth Amboy High School alumni
Politicians from Perth Amboy, New Jersey
New Jersey lawyers
University of Virginia alumni
New York University alumni
Rutgers School of Law–Newark alumni
New Jersey Democrats
American people of Latvian-Jewish descent
20th-century American lawyers